Shawnee Township is one of twenty-four townships in Bates County, Missouri, and is part of the Kansas City metropolitan area within the USA.  As of the 2000 census, its population was 277.

Shawnee Township has the name of the Shawnee Indians.

Geography
According to the United States Census Bureau, Shawnee Township covers an area of 35.82 square miles (92.76 square kilometers); of this, 35.76 square miles (92.61 square kilometers, 99.84 percent) is land and 0.06 square miles (0.15 square kilometers, 0.16 percent) is water.

Adjacent townships
 Grand River Township (north)
 Mingo Township (northeast)
 Spruce Township (east)
 Deepwater Township (southeast)
 Summit Township (south)
 Mount Pleasant Township (southwest)
 Mound Township (west)
 Deer Creek Township (northwest)

Cemeteries
The township contains these three cemeteries: Cloud, France and Nichols.

School districts
 Adrian County R-III
 Ballard R-II
 Butler R-V School District

Political districts
 Missouri's 4th congressional district
 State House District 120
 State Senate District 31

References
 United States Census Bureau 2008 TIGER/Line Shapefiles
 United States Board on Geographic Names (GNIS)
 United States National Atlas

External links
 US-Counties.com
 City-Data.com

Townships in Bates County, Missouri
Townships in Missouri